Omega Phi Beta is a sorority founded on March 15, 1989 at the State University of New York in Albany, New York by seventeen women of diverse cultural and ethnic backgrounds.  It is a member organization of National Association of Latino Fraternal Organizations (NALFO).

The sorority has undergraduate and alumnae chapters and colonies predominantly based on the East Coast. The organization has expanded into the Midwest, California, and South East in the recent years.
The organization's goal, as its motto ("Serving and Educating Through Our Diversity") implies, is to create an outlet for all women through its emphasis on multiculturalism. The organization also concerns community service and sisterhood. OPBSI is Latina-oriented, not Latina-based, further emphasizing its dedication to diversity.

Philanthropy
Omega Phi Beta concerns overcoming the injustices and oppression of women in society. It celebrates the success of past women, recognizes the accomplishments of women today, and promotes to uplift future generations. Recognizing that violence against women hinders progression, it has broadened the scope of its National Philanthropy to include all forms of violence affecting women, including but not limited to: domestic violence, sexual assault, sexual harassment, sexual mutilation, stalking and human trafficking.

Through its broadened National Philanthropy, Raising Awareness of Violence Against Women, Omega Phi Beta will continue to dedicate themselves to community while making a commitment to women's rights. It believes that its partnership with Amnesty International (established June 2005) will assist this.

It has helped to raise over ten thousand dollars towards AIDS research and Domestic Violence Awareness initiatives, created youth mentoring groups such as S.O.U.L. (Steppin’ Off to Unite Latinas) and the Madrinas Program, created various scholarships such as the Reach For the Gold book scholarship, and was the first Latina sorority to participate in and win Step Correct, a traditionally NPHC competition (January 1, 2007).

Omega Phi Beta Foundation
Omega Phi Beta Foundation (OPBF) has been organized to operate exclusively for charitable and educational purposes within the scope of Section 501 (c)(3) of the U.S. Internal Revenue Code.
Omega Phi Beta Foundation (OPBF) is a national, philanthropic organization committed to providing leadership, academic & community development opportunities, through educational, fundraising & grant-making initiatives, that support individuals and organizations dedicated to advancing women's rights in STEM/STEAM (Science, Technology, Engineering, Arts, & Math).

OPBF's mission is to implement and support initiatives for women and girls that strive to build a safe and equitable world for all via leadership and educational programs for communities nationwide. The organization was created in response to the ongoing need for role models and leaders in the community.

Awards & Recognitions
2003, 2004, 2005 - LatinosStep Annual Summer Step Show - National Champions
2006 - LatinosStep 5th Annual Silk and Smooth Stroll Champions
2007 - StepCorrect National Step Competition Champions
2007 - MTV True Life - I'm Stepping - Featuring the journey of the Soul Steppin' Divas National Step Team compete
2011, 2012, 2013 - Art of Stepping - RISC Step/Stroll Championship - National Step Champions
2012, 2013 - RISC Step/Stroll Championship - National Stroll Champions
2014 - Art of Stepping (AOS) Inductees to the Art of Step/Stroll Hall of Fame
Notable Members: Eve Torres, Caridad De La Luz 'La Bruja', Jessica 'REMO' Saul, Founder of the Art of Stepping, World of Step & World of Step Media; Monica Rivera, Author; Dr. Ariana Curtis; Dr. Cassandra St. Vil; Cindy Chu, writer, producer and actor in Queens

Chapter List

References

External links
Omega Phi Beta homepage

Student organizations established in 1989
Student societies in the United States
National Association of Latino Fraternal Organizations
Hispanic and Latino American organizations
Latino fraternities and sororities
1989 establishments in New York (state)